David Charles Carnegie, 4th Duke of Fife (born 3 March 1961) is a British peer and businessman. He is the only surviving son of the late James Carnegie, 3rd Duke of Fife, and his former wife Caroline Dewar. He was styled Earl of Macduff until 1992, and then Earl of Southesk until succeeding his father on 22 June 2015 as the fourth Duke of Fife and Chief of the Clan Carnegie. He is the highest person in line of succession to the British throne who is not a descendant of George V. He is a third cousin of King Charles III.

Education and career
Carnegie was educated at Eton College and graduated from Pembroke College, Cambridge, in 1982 with a BA degree. He was employed by London-based stock brokerage firm Cazenove between 1982 and 1985. In 1986, he received the MA degree given to Cambridge graduates who have an earned BA. He was also educated at Royal Agricultural College in Cirencester, Gloucestershire.

Between 1988 and 1989, Carnegie was with the Edinburgh-based investment management firm of Bell, Lawrie and Company. He graduated from the University of Edinburgh Business School in 1990 with an MBA degree. Between 1992 and 1996, he was with chartered accountants and financial advisers Reeves and Neylan. As of 2003, he lives at Kinnaird Castle in Angus, Scotland. Kinnaird is one of the Carnegie family seats.

Marriage and issue
Carnegie married on 16 June 1987 in London, Greater London, Middlesex, Caroline Anne Bunting (born Windsor, Berkshire, 13 November 1961), only daughter of Martin Brian Bunting (East Grinstead, West Sussex, born 1934) and wife Veronica Mary Cope (Wolverhampton, Staffordshire, born 1936). They have three sons:
 Charles Duff Carnegie, Earl of Southesk (born Edinburgh, Midlothian, 1 July 1989), married on 5 September 2020 at Kinnaird Castle, Brechin, Camille Ascoli (born Paris, 6 March 1990), daughter of Roberto Ascoli (born Milan, June 1961) and wife Valérie Marie Christine Ledoux, daughter of Marc Ledoux (Soissons, 20 June 1932 - Villers-Cotterêts, 24 December 2012) and wife Françoise Marie Jolicoeur.  They have one daughter: Lady Chloe Françoise Carnegie (b. 15 December 2022) 
 Lord George William Carnegie (born Edinburgh 23 March 1991)
 Lord Hugh Alexander Carnegie (born Dundee 10 June 1993)

The Duchess of Fife is a Deputy Lieutenant (DL) for Angus.

Other titles
 13th Earl of Southesk (Peerage of Scotland)
 4th Earl of Macduff (Peerage of the United Kingdom)
 13th Lord Carnegie of Kinnaird (Peerage of Scotland)
 13th Lord Carnegie, of Kinnaird and Leuchars (Peerage of Scotland)
 5th Baron Balinhard, of Farnell in the County of Forfar (Peerage of the United Kingdom)
 10th Carnegie Baronet, of Pittarrow in the County of Kincardine (Baronetage of Nova Scotia)

Titles, styles, honours and arms
 3 March 1961 – 16 February 1992: Earl of Macduff
 16 February 1992 – 22 June 2015: Earl of Southesk
 22 June 2015 – present: His Grace The Duke of Fife

Notes and sources

Other sources
 "Burke's Peerage and Baronetage"

1961 births
Living people
People educated at Eton College
Alumni of Pembroke College, Cambridge
Alumni of the University of Edinburgh
Dukes of Fife
People educated at Heatherdown School
Scottish clan chiefs